The central sterile services department (CSSD), also called sterile processing department (SPD), sterile processing, central supply department (CSD), or central supply, is an integrated place in hospitals and other health care facilities that performs sterilization and other actions on medical devices, equipment and consumables; for subsequent use by health workers in the operating theatre of the hospital and also for other aseptic procedures, e.g. catheterization, wound stitching and bandaging in a medical, surgical, maternity or paediatric ward.

Background
The operations of a sterile services department usually consist of the cleaning, disinfection, and sterilization of reusable medical equipment. Reusable medical equipment, or RME, can consist of any medical equipment from stainless steel surgical instrumentation, to IV pumps and crash carts. RME is separated into three classes: non-critical, semi-critical, and critical, with each class requiring a minimum level of reprocessing.

Non-critical items, such as IV poles and pumps, require a minimum of intermediate level disinfection which can be accomplished with most hospital disinfectants.

Semi-critical items are items that are expected to have contact with what an intact mucous membrane, and normally consists of endoscopes like those used in colonoscopies.
These items require high level disinfectants such as glutaraldehyde solution, peracetic acid, or hydrogen peroxide plasma.

Critical items, which include any instrument which will be introduced into a patient blood stream or in a normally sterile area of the body, require sterilization.

Sterilization methods in use 

Sterilization is the process of destroying all living organisms on an item and is the main task of most sterile services departments. Items to be sterilized must first be cleaned in a separate decontamination room and inspected for effectiveness, cleanliness and damage. There are multiple methods of sterilization, and which one is used is dependent on many factors including: operational cost, potential hazards to workers, efficacy, time, and composition of the materials being sterilized.

In the US, one of the cheapest and easiest methods is steam sterilization, where instrumentation trays and packages are placed in a chamber which is them filled with  steam, killing all microorganisms.

Sterilization can also be achieved using ethylene oxide (ETO) gas. This process was created in the 1950s by the US military and is used on items that cannot withstand the high temperatures of steam sterilization. ETO sterilization takes far longer than steam sterilization and is hazardous to workers, so alternative methods were created in the 1990s. The most common method for sterilizing at low temperatures today is by using hydrogen peroxide plasma, which has near zero risk to workers and cycles take a fraction of the time of ETO sterilization.

Depending on the healthcare facility's policy, there will be either an event related or time related sterile storage policy. If the policy is time related, an expiration date is placed on the sterile package, before being supplied to the end-user as a sterile product. If along the supply route, the sealed package got damaged or opened by a health worker, it needs to be returned to the CSSD for re-sterilization. If the healthcare facility's policy is event related, the package is considered sterile until an event occurs to compromise its sterility (e.g. opened, dropped package, high humidity conditions, etc.)

Decontamination is the most important step in the sterilization process beginning with point of use cleaning in the operating room. Items must be cleaned according to the manufacturer's instructions for use (IFU's). These must be followed for each item processed. Failure to properly clean a device will prevent sterilization from occurring. There are several factors that contribute to having a properly functioning decontamination area: [1] there must be proper dilution of detergents or damage to instruments will occur to include rusting and discoloration, [2] lumens are a big issue so there must be an assortment of brushes with varying lengths and diameters to thoroughly clean inside lumened instruments, [3] SPD staff need to be competent in the use of all processing equipment, [4] monthly in-service should be recurring and completed by the manufacturer's representative, [5] efficacy testing of the equipment should be completed and documented ensuring equipment is functioning as intended.

Sterile processing technician
A sterile processing technician is someone who cleans and sterilizes used surgical instruments and other medical supplies so that they can be safely redistributed and reused on future patients. This work is usually centralized in a special department of the medical facility.

Job titles include the following: 
Sterile processing and distribution technician (SPD tech or CPD tech)
Central sterile supply technician (CSS tech)
Central processing technician (CPT)
Central service technician (CST)
Certified Sterile Science Technician (CSST)
Sterile Science Associate (SSA) - degree
Sterile Scientist (SS)- degree
Master of Sterile Sciences (MSS) - degree

Divisions
Sterile processing departments are typically divided into four major areas to accomplish the functions of decontamination, assembly and sterile processing, sterile storage, and distribution.

Decontamination
Disassembly & decontaminating used surgical instruments and other medical devices
Operating and maintaining special decontamination equipment like automatic washers/disinfectants, ultrasonic cleaners
Inspecting decontaminated items to make sure they are clean
Assembly
 Utilize PPE's to protect self from acquiring harmful microorganisms

Sterilization and storage
Assembly & wrapping of cleaned and decontaminated instruments
Sterilizing assembled trays of instruments in appropriate sterilizers
Precisely operating and monitoring special sterilization equipment like autoclaves
Keeping detailed records of number of sterilized items, including Autoclave cycle numbers, lot/batch numbers, expiration dates for future tracking of items that has been sterilized, and stored

Distribution
Stocking crash carts
Organizing sterilized medical supplies
Ensuring that sterile supplies do not become outdated / preventing event related sterility issues
Delivering sterile supplies where they are needed and picking up dirty ones

See also
 Autoclave
 Hospital warehouse
 Sterilization (microbiology)

References 

Hospital departments